Dextromethorphan/quinidine, sold under the brand name Nuedexta, is a fixed-dose combination medication for the treatment of pseudobulbar affect (PBA). It contains dextromethorphan (DXM) and the class I antiarrhythmic agent quinidine.

Dextromethorphan/quinidine was approved for medical use in the United States in October 2010, and is marketed by Avanir Pharmaceuticals.

Medical uses
DXM/quinidine is used in the treatment of PBA. In a 12-week randomized, double-blind trial, amyotrophic lateral sclerosis and multiple sclerosis patients with significant PBA were given either Nuedexta 20/10 mg or placebo. In 326 randomized patients, the PBA-episode daily rate was 46.9% (p < 0.0001) lower for Nuedexta than for placebo. The three deaths in each of the two drug treatment arms and the single death in the placebo arm of the study were believed to be due to the natural course of the disease.

Contraindications
 Atrioventricular (AV) block, complete, without implanted pacemaker or at high risk of complete AV block 
 Concomitant use with drugs containing quinidine, quinine, or mefloquine 
 Concomitant use with drugs that both prolong the QT interval and are metabolized by CYP2D6 (e.g., thioridazine, pimozide); effects on QT interval may be increased 
 Concomitant use with MAOIs or use of MAOIs within 14 days; risk of serious, potentially fatal, drug interactions including serotonin syndrome 
 Heart failure 
 Hypersensitivity to dextromethorphan 
 Hypersensitivity to quinine, mefloquine, quinidine, or dextromethorphan/quinidine with a history of thrombocytopenia, hepatitis, bone marrow depression or lupus-like syndrome induced by these drugs 
 QT interval, prolonged or congenital long QT syndrome or a history suggesting torsades de pointes

Adverse effects
Common risks and side effects include:

 Abdominal pain
 Asthenia
 Cough
 Diarrhea (reported in 13% of patients)
 Dizziness
 Elevated gamma glutamyltransferase
 Flu-like symptoms
 Flatulence
 Prolonged QT interval
 Muscle spasm 
 Peripheral edema
 Urinary tract infection
 Vomiting

Interactions
 Desipramine (CYP2D6 substrate) levels increase 8-fold with co-administration
 Paroxetine (CYP2D6 inhibitor and substrate)
 Memantine

Pharmacology

Pharmacodynamics
Dextromethorphan acts as a σ1 receptor agonist, serotonin–norepinephrine reuptake inhibitor, and NMDA receptor antagonist, while quinidine is an antiarrhythmic agent acting as a CYP2D6 inhibitor. Quinidine prevents the metabolism of dextromethorphan into its active metabolite dextrorphan, which is a much more potent NMDA receptor antagonist but much less potent serotonin reuptake inhibitor than dextromethorphan. The mechanism of action of dextromethorphan/quinidine in the treatment of PBA is unknown.

Research
Dextromethorphan/quinidine was investigated for the treatment of agitation associated with dementia, diabetic neuropathy, drug-induced dyskinesia, migraine, and neuropathic pain, but development for these indications was discontinued. Another formulation, deudextromethorphan/quinidine, is still under investigation for various indications. These include agitation, schizophrenia, and major depressive disorder, among others.

See also
 Bupropion/dextromethorphan
 Deudextromethorphan/quinidine

References

External links
 

Combination drugs
Otsuka Pharmaceutical